Cochylimorpha simulata is a species of moth of the family Tortricidae. It is found in Iran (Shahkuh, Elburz region).

References

Moths described in 1970
Cochylimorpha
Taxa named by Józef Razowski
Moths of Asia